The 2016–17 Melbourne Renegades season is the sixth in the club's history. Coached by Andrew McDonald and captained by Aaron Finch, they competed in the BBL's 2016–17 season.

Fixtures

Pre-season

Regular season

Ladder

Ladder progress

Squad information
The following is the Renegades men squad for the 2016–17 Big Bash League season as of 6 January 2017.

Season statistics

Most runs

Source: ESPNcricinfo, 22 January 2017

Most wickets

Source: ESPNcricinfo, 22 January 2017.

Home attendance

TV audience
BBL games are currently broadcast in Australia by the free-to-air Network Ten.

Following are the television ratings for the Melbourne Renegades's 2016–17 BBL season matches in Australia.

References

External links
 Official website of the Melbourne Renegades
 Official website of the Big Bash League

Melbourne Renegades seasons